St. John of Rila in Chicago, referred to in Bulgarian as 'Tsurkva Sveti Ivan Rilski' is a historic church of the Orthodox Church of America located in Chicago, Illinois.  It is considered to be one of the most aesthetically noteworthy churches in the Portage Park area of Chicago.

History
The church building was originally built and housed a Lutheran congregation under the name of the Peace Lutheran Church.  The building was put up for auction as Peace Lutheran consolidated its parish with a number of other Lutheran congregations on Chicago's Northwest Side. The congregation of St. John of Rila, Wonderworker which had formed in February 1996 was looking for a church of its own as it had been celebrating services in the Holy Cross Chapel at St. Andrew Greek Orthodox Church in Chicago. After winning the highly competitive auction, the first services at the new beautiful church were celebrated on February 7, 1999.

Today, St. John of Rila is an extremely important center for Bulgarians in Chicago because of the specificity of national churches in America to function not only as a place of worship, but also as an important social center devoted to maintaining the language, culture and tradition of the Bulgarian diaspora through Sunday schools and social gatherings.

In October 2003, Princess Marie Louise of Bulgaria toured the church.

Architecture
The original interior has been adapted to conform to Eastern Orthodox liturgical requirements, and a traditional hand carved iconostasis has been installed. The  finished basement has a large auditorium with a stage used for theatrical and cultural performances." The parish house which is attached to the church building was completed in 1923 and served as the main place of worship until the church's completion in December 1928.

In 2008, the Church underwent a renovation. The sanctuary, which was previously located at the west end of the church, was moved to the east end to fulfill the requirement for Bulgarian Orthodox Churches. A new entrance was built as well since the old one was located at the east end.

See also
St. John of Rila

External links 
 St. John of Rila Church in Chicago OCA listing
 Official website of St. John of Rila in Chicago
 Webpage of the ELCA archives dedicated to Peace Lutheran Church in Chicago

References

Christian organizations established in 1996
John Of Rila
Bulgarian-American history
Churches completed in 1928
20th-century Eastern Orthodox church buildings
Bulgarian Orthodox churches in the United States
20th-century churches in the United States